Lengue people, or Balengue, are an African ethnic group, members of the Bantu group, who are indigenous to Equatorial Guinea and Gabon. Their indigenous language is Lengue. Today Bengas inhabit the coast region of the country's mainland, between Bata and the Gabonese border. This ethnic group has become increasingly influence by Fang culture during the past couple of decades; but have maintained their linguistic identity. They are referred to as Ndowe or "Playeros" (Beach People in Spanish), one of several peoples on the Rio Muni coast.

References